The 2009 Big East Conference baseball tournament was held at Bright House Field in Clearwater, FL. This was the twenty fifth annual Big East Conference baseball tournament, and third to be held at Bright House Field. The  won their second tournament championship in a row and claimed the Big East Conference's automatic bid to the 2009 NCAA Division I baseball tournament. Louisville joined the league prior to the 2006 season.

Format and seeding 
The Big East baseball tournament was an 8 team double elimination tournament in 2009. The top eight regular season finishers were seeded one through eight based on conference winning percentage only. The field was divided into two brackets, with the winners of each bracket meeting in a single championship game.

Tournament 

† - Indicates game was suspended after 7 innings due to 10 run mercy rule. ‡ - Indicates game was suspended after 8 innings due to 10 run mercy rule.

All-Tournament Team 
The following players were named to the All-Tournament team.

Jack Kaiser Award 
Andrew Clark was the winner of the 2009 Jack Kaiser Award. Clark was a junior first baseman for Louisville.

References 

Tournament
Big East Conference Baseball Tournament
Big East Conference baseball tournament
Big East Conference baseball tournament
College baseball tournaments in Florida
Baseball competitions in Clearwater, Florida